Kalya Jagannath Rao (born 7 December 1940), popularly known as K. J. Rao, is an Indian physical chemist and an Emeritus professor at the Indian Institute of Science. He is known for his researches on nanomaterials, amorphous Materials and ceramics and is an elected fellow of the Indian National Science Academy, National Academy of Sciences, India, International Academy of Ceramics, Asia Pacific Academy of Materials and World Innovation Foundation and the Indian Academy of Sciences. The Council of Scientific and Industrial Research, the apex agency of the Government of India for scientific research, awarded him the Shanti Swarup Bhatnagar Prize for Science and Technology, one of the highest Indian science awards, in 1984, for his contributions to chemical sciences. He is also a recipient of the Ordre des Palmes Académiques of the Government of France.

Biography 

Jagannatha Rao, born on 7 December 1940 to Kalya Ananthamurthy and Nagamma at Kalya, a village in the south Indian state of Karnataka, passed BSc hons in 1960 from the University of Mysore and followed it up with MSc in physical chemistry from the same university in 1961. The same year, he joined National College, Bangalore as a lecturer at their chemistry department and worked there until 1964 before enrolling at IIT Kanpur for his doctoral studies under the guidance of renowned chemist, C. N. R. Rao, a Bharat Ratna laureate. He secured a PhD in 1967 and continued his post-doctoral studies under the same mentor until 1972. Moving to the US, he also worked under C. A. Angell at Purdue University and with A. R. Cooper at Case Western Reserve University. Returning to India in 1972, he joined National Aerospace Laboratories where he worked until 1978 when he became associated with the Indian Institute of Science as a professor at the Solid State and Structural Chemistry Unit. He worked at the Unit until his superannuation and post-retirement, serves as an Emeritus professor and Ramanna Senior fellow there.

Rao is married to Sudha and the couple has a child Named As Kalya Vijaya Sarathy. The family lives in Bengaluru.

Legacy 
Rao has been a part of several research groups; he collaborated with V. C. Veeranna Gowda and C. Narayana Reddy of Bangalore University for his studies of glasses and ceramics, with S. A. Shivashankar of Indian Institute of Science for studies of zinc oxide nanostructures and with A. Naik of Kuvempu University for investigating nanomaterials. His researches on ceramics and glasses are reported to have returned a new structural model for ionic glasses and a model for glass transition. He discovered energy efficient protocols for the preparation of many advanced ceramics. He has released his researches as four books which include Structural Chemistry of Glasses, a comprehensive text on glasses and Current Trends in the Science and Technology of Glass as well as 290 articles published in peer-reviewed journals. His work has been cited by many authors and he has mentored 24 doctoral and one post graduate student in their studies. He served as the chair of the Materials Research Centre of IISc during 1984–91 and headed the Division of Chemical Sciences from 1992 to 1997. He is one of the founders of the Indo-French Laboratory for Solid State Chemistry (IFLaSC) at IISc which would later earn him a French state honor.

Awards and honors 
The Council of Scientific and Industrial Research awarded Rao the Shanti Swarup Bhatnagar Prize, one of the highest Indian science awards, in 1984. He received the S. R. Palt Award of the Indian Association for the Cultivation of Science in 1993 and the Material Science Award of the Material Science Society of India (MRSI) in 1995; MRSI would honor him again in 2002 with the Distinguished Materials Scientist of the Year award. The Indian National Science Academy awarded him the Materials Science Prize in 1999 and he received two awards in 2000, the Alumni Award for Excellence in Research of the Indian Institute of Science and the gold medal for Research of the University of Bordeaux I. The Silver Medal of the Chemical Research Society of India reached him in 2002 and he received the Lifetime Achievement Award and Gold Medal of International Symposium on Circuits and Systems in 2005. He is a recipient of two state honors; the Ordre des Palmes Académiques of the Government of France (2006) and Sir M. Visweswaraiah Award of the Government of Karnataka (2007). He is an elected fellow of all the three major Indian science academies viz. Indian National Science Academy, Indian Academy of Sciences, National Academy of Sciences, India and a fellow of the  International Academy of Ceramics, Asia Pacific Academy of Materials and World Innovation Foundation. He is also a recipient of honorary doctorates from the Indian Institute of Science (1988) and the University of Bordeaux 1 (2000).

Citations

Selected bibliography

Books

Articles

See also 
 C. N. R. Rao

Notes

References 

Recipients of the Shanti Swarup Bhatnagar Award in Chemical Science
1940 births
Indian scientific authors
Fellows of the Indian Academy of Sciences
Fellows of the Indian National Science Academy
Scientists from Karnataka
University of Mysore alumni
IIT Kanpur alumni
Purdue University alumni
Case Western Reserve University alumni
Indian physical chemists
Academic staff of Bangalore University
Academic staff of the Indian Institute of Science
Fellows of The National Academy of Sciences, India
20th-century Indian chemists
Recipients of the Ordre des Palmes Académiques
Living people
Indian technology writers